Hiraethog may refer to:

Gruffudd Hiraethog (died 1564), Welsh language poet
Hiraethog Rural District, rural district in Denbighshire, Wales, from 1935 to 1974
Mynydd Hiraethog, upland region in Conwy and Denbighshire in north-east Wales
William Rees (Gwilym Hiraethog) (1802–1883), Welsh poet and author